Court Hill is a Site of Special Scientific Interest near Clevedon, Somerset, UK

Court Hill may also refer to:

Court Hill Historic District, Iowa, U.S.
Court Hill (Sussex), an archaeological site in West Sussex, UK

See also
Moot hill, historic mound where court cases might have been settled 
Courthouse Hill Historic District, Wisconsin, U.S.